Arun Pathak (born 14 April 1973) is an Indian politician, social activist and teacher. He was born and raised in Kanpur. He is a member of BJP. He also studied and worked as a chemistry teacher at BNSD Inter College in Kanpur. In 2015 he was elected as Member of Legislative Council in a by-election from Kanpur Division Graduates Constituency as the BJP candidate.

He defeated a member of the Swarup family of Kanpur; successive members of that family had previously held the seat since 1916.

References

 http://www.jagran.com/uttar-pradesh/lucknow-city-bjps-arun-pathak-won-kanpurunnao-mlc-seat-12009112.html

1973 births
Living people
Place of birth missing (living people)
Bharatiya Janata Party politicians from Uttar Pradesh
Members of the Uttar Pradesh Legislative Council
21st-century Indian politicians